The Necro Files is a 1997 horror comedy zombie film by director Matt Jaissle. The film depicts zombies as sexual creatures whose desires for human flesh are not limited to anthropophagy.

Plot
The film follows a zombie rapist as he returns from the dead to cannibalize and assault the living.

Reception
Erik Piepenburg of The New York Times called the film a "jaw-droppingly gory trash fest" which should be seen by "video disciples with steel caldrons for stomachs". Noreen Giffney expresses in her book Queering the Non/human that the film "offers cinematic representations of clinical associations between criminality, murder and necrophilia" but that the film is infantile.

Sequels
The film was followed by two sequels Necro Files 2 (2003) and Necro Filles 3000 (2017).

See also
 List of zombie films
 Zombie pornography

References

External links
 

1997 horror films
1997 films
American zombie comedy films
Camcorder films
Necrophilia in film
1990s English-language films
1990s American films
American splatter films